The 1926 St. Xavier Musketeers football team was an American football team that represented St. Xavier College (later renamed Xavier University) in the Ohio Athletic Conference (OAC) during the 1926 college football season. In its seventh season under head coach Joseph A. Meyer, the team compiled a 9–1 record (1–0 against OAC opponents) and outscored opponents by a total of 348 to 64. After winning its first nine games, the team's lost on Thanksgiving Day to the undefeated 1926 Haskell Indians football team that led the country in scoring. The team played its home games at Corcoran Field in Cincinnati.

Schedule

References

St. Xavier
Xavier Musketeers football seasons
St. Xavier Musketeers football